William Russell, 1st Baron Russell of Thornhaugh (died 9 August 1613) was an English nobleman, politician, peer, and knight. He was the younger son of Francis Russell, 2nd Earl of Bedford and his first wife Margaret St. John. His birthdate is uncertain, with some records showing that he was born as early as 1553, some as late as 1563. He was educated at Magdalen College, Oxford. After spending a few years abroad, he went to Ireland in 1580, and having seen some service in that country, he was knighted in September 1581.

Russell began his active military career in the Netherlands in 1585, being made lieutenant-general of cavalry. In September 1586 he distinguished himself at the Battle of Zutphen and was noted for maintaining an effective fighting force in difficult circumstances. He was appointed to the office of Governor of Flushing in 1587, but was recalled on his own initiative the following year. In 1594 he was appointed to the office of Lord Deputy of Ireland, where he served with flamboyance.

At the time, Ireland was on the point of rebellion, and there were two opinions in government on how to preserve the peace. One faction sought negotiation with the Irish rebels, while the other – including Russell – favoured military force. Russell's faction prevailed, and the rebellion grew into a general revolt, which lasted through the Nine Years War and ended with the Treaty of Mellifont in 1603. He successfully relieved the northern town of Enniskillen, which had been under siege for several months, but failed to capture the Irish leaders.

During his time in Ireland, Russell fell into dispute with his chief military commander, Sir John Norris. The dispute proved harmful to the crown government, and Russell was recalled to England in 1597, but only after he had defeated and killed the rebel Fiach MacHugh O'Byrne.

In 1599, Russell was named as leader of the forces defending western England in anticipation of a Spanish invasion. However, the invasion plans were thwarted.

Russell built the mansion of Woburn. In the 1590s, he consulted with three Dutchmen as to the potential for draining his manor of Thorney Abbey in Cambridgeshire; his son, Francis Russell, famously continued the family interest in drainage and led the undertakers in the first attempt to drain the Great Level of the Fens, later known as the Bedford Level.

Russell was created 1st Baron Russell of Thornhaugh in 1603 by the new king James I, but he lost influence at court and retired to his estates, where he died on 9 August 1613.

Russell married on 13 February 1585 at Watford, London, Elizabeth Long, only daughter and sole heiress of Henry Long of Shingay, Cambridgeshire, and granddaughter of Sir Richard Long. They had one son, Francis Russell, 4th Earl of Bedford. The church registers of St Mary's Church Watford record that the child was baptized in 1587.

Notes

References

16th-century births
1613 deaths
Year of birth uncertain
English soldiers

16th-century English soldiers
17th-century English soldiers
People of Elizabethan Ireland
William Russell, 1st Baron Russell of Thornhaugh
William
Younger sons of earls
17th-century English nobility
16th-century English nobility
People of the Nine Years' War (Ireland)
Lords Lieutenant of Ireland